A felucca (possibly originally from Greek) is a traditional wooden sailing boat used in the eastern Mediterranean—including around Malta and Tunisia—in Egypt and Sudan (particularly along the Nile and in protected waters of the Red Sea), and also in Iraq. Its rig consists of one or two lateen sails.

They are usually able to board ten passengers and the crew consists of two or three people.

Egypt
Despite the availability of motorboats and ferries, feluccas are still in active use as a means of transport in Nile-adjacent cities like Aswan or Luxor. They are especially popular among tourists who can enjoy a quieter and calmer mood than motorboats have to offer.

Feluccas were photographed by writer Göran Schildt's travels on the Nile in 1954-55 as part of his Mediterranean sea travels. Schildt documented them as being called "Ajasor".

San Francisco

A large fleet of lateen-rigged feluccas thronged San Francisco's docks before and after the construction of the state-owned Fisherman's Wharf in 1884. Light, small, and maneuverable, the feluccas were the mainstay of the fishing fleet of San Francisco Bay. John C. Muir, a small-craft curator at the SF Maritime Historical Park, said of them, "These workhorses featured a mast that angled, or raked, forward sharply, and a large triangular sail hanging down from a long, two-piece yard". Among the owners of feluccas in San Francisco Bay was the author Jack London, who recollected his adventure as a young oyster pirate in his works.

See also
 Dhow

References

Further reading
 Muscat, Joseph (2003) The Gilded Felucca and Maltese Boatbuilding Techniques. Pubblikazzjonijiet Indipendenza, Malta.

External links

Photographs from a felucca journey on the Nile

Sailboat types
Arab culture
Society of Malta
Types of fishing vessels
Sailing rigs and rigging
Arab inventions